Buckskin is an American Western television series starring Tom Nolan, Sally Brophy, and Mike Road. The series aired on the NBC network from July 3, 1958, until May 25, 1959, followed by summer reruns in 1959 and again in 1965.

Synopsis
The show depicts life in fictitious Buckskin, Montana, in the 1880s, as seen through the eyes of 10-year-old Jody O'Connell, played by Nolan. Jody's widowed mother, Annie, played by Brophy, runs the town's boarding house. The lives of Jody and Annie interact with the townspeople and strangers passing through Buckskin. Another constant is Marshal Tom Sellers, played by Mike Road, who keeps the peace. Young Nolan narrates the series while on a corral fence and playing a harmonica.

Cast
 Tom Nolan as Jody O'Connell
 Sally Brophy as Mrs. Annie O'Connell
 Mike Road as Marshal Tom Sellers
 Shirley Knight as Mrs. Newcomb
 Michael Lipton as Ben Newcomb
 Orville Sherman as Mr. Feeney

Notable guest stars
 Virginia Christine
 Andy Clyde
 Jane Darwell
 Kathleen Freeman
 Robert Fuller
 Don Grady
 Clegg Hoyt
 Ricky Kelman
 Roger Mobley
 Warren Oates 
 Dennis Patrick 
 Pernell Roberts 
 Olive Sturgess
 Lyle Talbot
 Vic Tayback

Episodes

Production notes
The series first ran on Thursday evenings at 9:30 Eastern from July to September 1958 as a summer replacement for The Ford Show, Starring Tennessee Ernie Ford, Friday evenings at 7:30 from October 1958 to January 1959, and Thursdays again at 7:30 from January to September 1959. The 1965 reruns were carried on Sundays at 8:30 pm. The Buckskin theme song was composed by Stanley Morton and Mort Green.

Notes
This show was produced by Tennessee Ernie Ford's company BetFord Corporation. It was Ernie's foray into production beyond The Ford Show.

References

Further reading
 McNeil, Alex. Total Television  (1996). New York: Penguin Books 
 Brooks, Tim and Marsh, Earle, The Complete Directory to Prime Time Network and Cable TV Shows (1999). New York: Ballantine Books

External links
 

1958 American television series debuts
1959 American television series endings
Black-and-white American television shows
English-language television shows
NBC original programming
Television series set in the 1880s
Television shows set in Montana
1950s Western (genre) television series
Television series by Universal Television